Tank Battalion (also known as Korean Attack) is a 1958 war film directed by Sherman A. Rose and starring Don Kelly, Leslie Parrish and Edward G. Robinson Jr. Four men in their tank, during the Korean War in 1951, find themselves behind enemy lines. American International Pictures originally released the film as a double feature with Hell Squad.

Plot
During the Korean War, four soldiers reminisce about their past romantic adventures. One of them is currently involved with an Army nurse, another with a Eurasian bargirl. When the tank crew takes their girlfriends on a picnic, they make contact with North Korean guerillas who later try to steal medical supplies from their base.

Resuming battle with the North Koreans, their tank breaks down against a cliff. One of the men risks life and limb to sneak out and retrieve a new gear box.

Soundtrack
Richard La Salle's first film score uses pieces of Debussy's Three Nocturnes For Orchestra.

Cast
 Don Kelly as Sgt. Brad Dunne
 Leslie Parrish as Lt. Alice Brent (as Marjorie Helen)
 Edward G. Robinson Jr. as Cpl Corbett
 Frank Gorshin as Pfc. 'Skids' Madigan
 Regina Gleason as Lt. Norma 'Red' O'Brien
 BarBara Luna as Nikko
 Robert Paget as Pfc Danny Collins
 Mark Sheeler as Captain Caswell
 Baynes Barron as Buck the Mechanic
 Tetsu Komai as 'Egg Charlie'
 John Trigonis as Motor Pool Lieutenant
 Don Devlin as Soldier
 Troy Patterson as Soldier
 Warren Crosby as Soldier

References

External links 
 
 
 

1958 films
1958 war films
1950s English-language films
American black-and-white films
American International Pictures films
American war films
Films about armoured warfare
Films scored by Richard LaSalle
Korean War films
1950s American films